Most ghost towns in Nevada in the United States of America are former mining boomtowns that were abandoned when the mines closed. Those that weren't set up as mining camps were usually established as locations for mills, or supply points for nearby mining operations.

In Clark County settlements along the Colorado River have been submerged underneath the reservoirs of Lake Mead or Lake Mohave. 

Conditions

Ghost towns can include sites in various states of disrepair and abandonment. Some sites no longer have any trace of buildings or civilization, and have reverted to empty land. Other sites are unpopulated but still have standing buildings. Still others may support full-time residents, though usually far fewer than at their historical peak, while others may now be museums or historical sites.

For ease of reference, the sites listed have been placed into one of the following general categories.

Barren site
 Site is no longer in existence
 Site has been destroyed, covered with water, or has reverted to empty land
 May have at most a few difficult-to-find foundations/footings 

Neglected site
 Little more than rubble remains at the site
 Dilapidated, often roofless buildings remain at the site

Abandoned site
 Buildings or houses still standing, but all or almost all are abandoned
 No population, with the possible exception of a caretaker
 Site no longer in use, except for one or two buildings

Semi-abandoned site
 Buildings or houses still standing, but most are abandoned
 A few residents may remain

Historic site
 Buildings or houses still standing
 Site has been converted to a historical site, museum, or tourist attraction
 Still a busy community, but population is smaller than in its peak years

List of ghost towns in Nevada

References

External links
Forgotten Nevada - Abandoned and historical sites in Nevada. Pictures and directions
Southern Nevada: The Boomtown Years 1900-1925

Nevada
Ghost towns
Ghost towns in Nevada